Sun Fanqing (born May 23, 1998), known professionally as Song Zu'er is a Chinese actress, model and singer. She made her debut as a child actress with television series The Sea and Sky Boundless (2005) and has gone on to appear in series such as Novoland: Eagle Flag (2019), Guardians of the Ancient Oath (2020), The Bond (2021), To Fly with You (2021), Cupid's Kitchen (2022), and Legally Romance (2022).

Early life
Song Zu'er was born Sun Fanqing on 23 May 1998 in Tianjin, China. Song studied in the United States for two years, and has an English name "Lareina".

Song was enrolled in the Beijing Film Academy in 2018, after placing third in the National Higher Education Entrance Examination.

Career

Child actress beginnings
In 2005, Song began her acting career with a supporting role in the drama The Sea and Sky Boundless. She then continued to act in various dramas, and gained recognition for playing Nezha in the 2009 television series Prelude of Lotus Lantern.

Return to acting
In 2016, Song returned to acting in the comedy film Papa, where she starred alongside Xia Yu. In 2017, Song joined the variety program Divas Hit the Road and became known to audiences.
The same year, Song played a supporting role in the youth drama Boy Hood where she starred alongside TFBoys.

In 2018, Song played lead roles in the fantasy historical drama The Dark Lord, as well as the comedy web series Gossip High. She received positive reviews for her acting performance and line delivery.

In 2019, Song starred in the fantasy epic drama Novoland: Eagle Flag. The same year, she was cast in romance comedy drama Cupid's Kitchen.  Forbes China listed Song under their 30 Under 30 Asia 2019 list which consisted of 30 influential people under 30 years old who have had a substantial effect in their fields.

In 2020, Song appeared in CCTV New Year's Gala for the first time, acting out a skit Airport Sisters. The same year, she starred in the fantasy historical drama  Guardians of the Ancient Oath.

On July 16 of the same year, she joined the main cast of the Novoland: Eagle Flag series where she played the brilliant young Yu Ran, the Princess of the Winged Tribe, until the end of the series on September 2 of the same year. 

In 2021, she joined the main cast of the series The Bond  where she will play Qiao Simei, one of the sisters of the Qiao family.

On November 22, 2021, she joined the main cast of the series To Fly With You where she played Shen Zheng Yi, A girl who loves speed skating joins a sports club behind her mother's back. 

In 2022, she will join the main cast of the Cupid's Kitchen series where she will play Lin Kesong, a novice cook who receives advice from master chef Jiang Qianfan (Ethan Juan) to prepare for a culinary competition.

On February 7, she will join the cast of the series Pride and Price (盛装) where she will play Li Na.

Filmography

Film

Television series

Television shows

Discography

Awards and nominations

References

External links
 

1998 births
Living people
Beijing Film Academy alumni
Actresses from Tianjin
Chinese film actresses
Chinese television actresses
21st-century Chinese actresses
Chinese child actresses
Chinese female models